The Trent Valley Way is a waymarked long-distance footpath in England following  the River Trent and its valley in the counties of  Nottinghamshire and Lincolnshire.

Originally created in 1998, to mark the centenary of the Nottinghamshire County Council, it was waymarked between the two southern starting points at Thrumpton and Attenborough, through to West Stockwith near Gainsborough at the northern limit of the county, a distance of some 84 miles.

This Nottinghamshire route used both riverside paths and footpaths in the wider valley to link Nottingham, with Newark-on-Trent, Gainsborough and various villages via points of interest. It appeared on Ordnance Survey maps, and a book showing the route was also produced.

The waymark consisted of a white disc with a blue arrow containing three wavy white lines.

Extending the Route
Various organisations were interested in extending the route of the Trent Valley Way so that it covered the entire length of the river from its source near Biddulph Moor in Staffordshire to Alkborough in Lincolnshire, where the Trent joins the Ouse to form the Humber estuary, a distance of 170 miles.

The feasibility of a complete route along the Trent Valley was investigated in 2008, and it was assessed to have "considerable potential", and would attract 250,000 annual walkers. These would enjoy the combined attraction of "the river’s rich natural heritage and its history as an inland navigation". A draft map using existing footpaths was drawn up in 2009 for the entire 170 mile route, with preferred and interim alternatives where there were major access issues.

One of the first revisions of the route was to remove the segment between Thrumpton to Nottingham, so that there was only a single starting point, which reduced the length to 77 miles. The start was then changed to Trentlock in Derbyshire, which extended the route slightly, so that it became 80 miles long.

Littleborough to Alkborough

Subsequently, plans were made to extend the path northwards along the tidal reaches to the Humber. In 2012 an extension of the waymarked route was confirmed, using paths mainly in North Lincolnshire to link the existing path with sections through to Alkborough, and a series of nine walking guides were produced to define this new 36 mile 58 km section. The first two sections act as a parallel route for part of the original valley way, but use riverside footpaths instead.

 Littleborough to Gainsborough 
 Gainsborough to West Stockwith 
 West Stockwith to Haxey 
 Haxey to Epworth 
 Epworth to Belton 
 Belton to Keadby 
 Keadby to Scunthorpe
 Scunthorpe to Burton Upon Stather 
 Burton Upon Stather to Alkborough

The end of the route is the maze at Julian's Bower, which has a viewpoint that overlooks Trent Falls.

Biddulph to Stone 
There are also plans to establish a definitive route in the upper reaches of the Trent, from Biddulph to Stone. A similar set of walking guides to those produced for the Littleborough to Alkborough section will be created, along with a waymarked route. A Heritage Lottery bid is being developed to fund this work.

See also
 List of fish in the River Trent

References

Long-distance footpaths in England
Footpaths in Lincolnshire
Footpaths in Nottinghamshire